Environmental justice is a social movement to address the unfair exposure of poor and marginalized communities to harms from hazardous waste, resource extraction, and other land uses. The movement has generated hundreds of studies showing that exposure to environmental harms is inequitably distributed.  

The global environmental justice movement arises from place-based environmental conflicts in which local environmental defenders frequently confront multi-national corporations in resource extraction or other industries. Local outcomes of these conflicts are increasingly influenced by trans-national environmental justice networks. 

The movement began in the United States in the 1980s and was heavily influenced by the American civil rights movement. The original conception of environmental justice in the 1980s focused on harms to marginalised racial groups within rich countries such as the United States and was framed as environmental racism. The movement was later expanded to consider gender, international environmental discrimination, and inequalities within disadvantaged groups. As the movement achieved some success in more affluent countries, environmental burdens have shifted to the Global South (as for example through extractivism or the global waste trade). The movement for environmental justice has thus become more global, with some of its aims now being articulated by the United Nations. 

Environmental justice scholars have produced a large interdisciplinary body of social science literature that includes political ecology, contributions to environmental law, and theories on justice and sustainability.

Definitions

Environmental justice is typically defined as distributive justice, which is the equitable distribution of environmental risks and benefits. Some definitions address procedural justice, which is the fair and meaningful participation in decision-making. Other scholars emphasise recognition justice, which is the recognition of oppression and difference in environmental justice communities. People's capacity to convert social goods into a flourishing community is a further criteria for a just society.
The United States Environmental Protection Agency defines environmental justice as:the fair treatment and meaningful involvement of all people regardless of race, color, national origin, or income, with respect to the development, implementation, and enforcement of environmental laws, regulations, and policies. 

Environmental justice is also discussed as environmental racism or environmental inequality.

History and scope 

The origins of the environmental justice movement can be traced to the Indigenous environmental movement, which itself has roots in over 500 years of colonialism, oppression, and ongoing struggles for sovereignty and land rights. Use of the terms 'environmental justice' and 'environmental racism' began in the United States with the 1982 PCB protests in Warren County, North Carolina. Dumping of PCB contaminated soil in the predominately Black community of Afton sparked massive protests, and over 500 people were arrested. Subsequent studies demonstrated that race was the most important factor predicting placement of hazardous waste facilities in the US. These studies were followed by widespread objections and lawsuits against hazardous waste disposal in poor, generally Black, communities. The mainstream environmental movement began to be criticised for its predominately white affluent leadership, emphasis on conservation, and failure to address social equity concerns.

Emergence of global movement 
Through the 1970s and 1980s, grassroots movements and environmental organizations promoted regulations that increased the costs of hazardous waste disposal in the US and other industrialized countries. Exports of hazardous waste to the Global South escalated through the 1980s and 1990s. Globally, disposal of toxic waste, land appropriation, and resource extraction leads to human rights violations and environmental conflict as the basis of the global environmental justice movement.

International formalization of environmental justice began with the First National People of Color Environmental Leadership Summit in 1991. The summit was held in Washington, DC, and was attended by over 650 delegates from every US state, Mexico, Chile, and other countries. Delegates adopted 17 principles of environmental justice which were circulated at the 1992 Earth Summit in Rio. Principle 10 of the Rio Declaration on Environment and Development states that individuals shall have access to information regarding environmental matters, participation in decisions, and access to justice.

Prior to the Leadership Summit in 1991, the scope of the environmental justice movement dealt primarily with anti-toxics and harms to certain marginalized racial groups within rich countries; during the summit, it was expanded to include public health, worker safety, land use, transportation, and many other issues. The movement was later expanded to more completely consider gender, international injustices, and inequalities within disadvantaged groups. Environmental justice has become a very broad global movement, and it has contributed several concepts to political ecology that have been adopted or formalized in academic literature. These concepts include ecological debt, environmental racism, climate justice, food sovereignty, corporate accountability, ecocide, sacrifice zones, environmentalism of the poor, and others.

Environmental justice seeks to expand the scope of human rights law which had previously failed to treat the relationship between the environment and human rights. Most human rights treaties do not have explicitly environmental provisions. Attempts to integrate environmental protection with human rights law include the codification of the human right to a healthy environment. Integrating environmental protections into human rights law remains problematic, especially in the case of climate justice.

Scholars such as Kyle Powys Whyte and Dina Gilio-Whitaker have extended the environmental justice discourse in relation to Indigenous people and settler-colonialism. Gilio-Whitaker points out that distributive justice presumes a capitalistic commodification of land that is inconsistent with Indigenous worldviews. Whyte discusses environmental justice in the context of catastrophic changes brought by colonisation to the environments that Indigenous peoples have relied upon for centuries to maintain their livelihoods and identities.

Environmental discrimination and conflict
The environmental justice movement seeks to address environmental discrimination and environmental racism associated with hazardous waste disposal, resource extraction, land appropriation, and other activities. This environmental discrimination results in the loss of land-based traditions and economies, armed violence (especially against women and indigenous people) environmental degradation, and environmental conflict. The global environmental justice movement arises from these local place-based conflicts in which local environmental defenders frequently confront multi-national corporations. Local outcomes of these conflicts are increasingly influenced by trans-national environmental justice networks.

There are many divisions along which unjust distribution of environmental burdens may fall. Within the US, race is the most important determinant of environmental injustice. In some other countries, poverty or caste (India) are important indicators. Tribal affiliation is also important in some countries. Environmental justice scholars Laura Pulido and David Pellow argue that recognizing environmental racism as an element stemming from the entrenched legacies of racial capitalism is crucial to the movement, with white supremacy continuing to shape human relationships with nature and labor.

Environmental racism 

The relationship between environmental racism and environmental inequality is recognized throughout the developed and developing world. An example of global environmental racism is the disproportionate location of hazardous waste facilities in vulnerable communities. For example, much hazardous waste in Africa is not actually produced there but rather exported by developed countries such as the U.S.

Hazardous waste

As environmental justice groups have grown more successful in developed countries such as the United States, the burdens of global production have been shifted to the Global South where less-strict regulations makes waste disposal cheaper. Export of toxic waste from the US escalated throughout the 1980s and 1990s. Many impacted countries do not have adequate disposal systems for this waste, and impacted communities are not informed about the hazards they are being exposed to.

The Khian Sea waste disposal incident was a notable example of environmental justice issues arising from international movement of toxic waste. Contractors disposing of ash from waste incinerators in Philadelphia, Pennsylvania illegally dumped the waste on a beach in Haiti after several other countries refused to accept it. After more than ten years of debate, the waste was eventually returned to Pennsylvania. The incident contributed to the creation of the Basel Convention that regulates international movement of toxic waste.

Land appropriation 
Countries in the Global South disproportionately bear the environmental burden of global production and the costs of over-consumption in Western societies. This burden is exacerbated by changes in land use that shift vast tracts of land away from family and subsistence farming toward multi-national investments in land speculation, agriculture, mining, or conservation. Land grabs in the Global South are engendered by neoliberal ideology and differences in legal frameworks, land prices, and regulatory practices that make countries in the Global South attractive to foreign investments. These land grabs endanger indigenous livelihoods and continuity of social, cultural, and spiritual practices. Resistance to land appropriation through transformative social action is also made difficult by pre-existing social inequity and deprivation; impacted communities are often already struggling just to meet their basic needs.

Resource extraction 
Hundreds of studies have shown that marginalized communities are disproportionately burdened by the negative environmental consequences of resource extraction. Communities near valuable natural resources are frequently saddled with a resource curse wherein they bear the environmental costs of extraction and a brief economic boom that leads to economic instability and ultimately poverty. Power disparities between extraction industries and impacted communities lead to acute procedural injustice in which local communities are unable to meaningfully participate in decisions that will shape their lives.

Studies have also shown that extraction of critical minerals, timber, and petroleum may be associated with armed violence in communities that host mining operations. The government of Canada found that resource extraction leads to missing and murdered indigenous women in communities impacted by mines and infrastructure projects such as pipelines.

Relationships to other movements and philosophies

Climate justice 

Climate change and climate justice have also been a component when discussing environmental justice and the greater impact it has on environmental justice communities. Air pollution and water pollution are two contributors of climate change that can have detrimental effects such as extreme temperatures, increase in precipitation, and a rise in sea level. Because of this, communities are more vulnerable to events including floods and droughts potentially resulting in food scarcity and an increased exposure to infectious, food-related, and water-related diseases. It has been projected that climate change will have the greatest impact on vulnerable populations.

Climate justice has been influenced by environmental justice, especially grassroots climate justice.

Environmentalism 

Relative to general environmentalism, environmental justice is seen as having a greater focus on the lives of everyday people and being more grassroots. Environmental justice advocates have argued that mainstream environmentalist movements have sometimes been racist and elitist.

Reproductive justice 

Many participants in the Reproductive Justice Movement see their struggle as linked with those for environmental justice, and vice versa. Loretta Ross describes the reproductive justice framework as addressing "the ability of any woman to determine her own reproductive destiny" and argues this is "linked directly to the conditions in her community – and these conditions are not just a matter of individual choice and access." Such conditions include those central to environmental justice – including the siting of toxic waste and pollution of food, air, and waterways. 

Mohawk midwife Katsi Cook founded the Mother's Milk Project in the 1980s to address the toxic contamination of maternal bodies through exposure to fish and water contaminated by a General Motors Superfund site. In underscoring how contamination disproportionately impacted Akwesasne women and their children through gestation and breastfeeding, this project illustrates the intersections between reproductive and environmental justice. Cook explains that, "at the breasts of women flows the relationship of those generations both to society and to the natural world."

Cost barriers 
One of the prominent barriers to minority participation in environmental justice is the initial costs of trying to change the system and prevent companies from dumping their toxic waste and other pollutants in areas with high numbers of minorities living in them. There are massive legal fees involved in fighting for environmental justice and trying to shed environmental racism. For example, in the United Kingdom, there is a rule that the claimant may have to cover the fees of their opponents, which further exacerbates any cost issues, especially with lower-income minority groups; also, the only way for environmental justice groups to hold companies accountable for their pollution and breaking any licensing issues over waste disposal would be to sue the government for not enforcing rules. This would lead to the forbidding legal fees that most could not afford. This can be seen by the fact that out of 210 judicial review cases between 2005 and 2009, 56% did not proceed due to costs.

Income inequality 

The relationship between economic inequality and environmental inequality plays a large role in understanding certain reasons that account for the cause of environmental inequality. The association between income inequality and environmental inequality can be measured by the environmental Kuznets curve. This curve states that when income per capita is high, the rate of pollution in that area rises until income reaches a certain threshold, once this threshold of wealth is passed then pollution in that area begins to decrease. In the case of developing nations, an increase in pollution and production of greenhouse gases occurs as that nation undergoes economic growth, therefore for developing nations to escape poverty through growth pollution must be produced. This pollution is often caused through industry and manufacturing. Once the developing nation becomes a developed nation then we begin to see a drop off in pollution as a better alternative to high pollution industry can be found to stimulate the economy. Renewable energy has been more expensive to produce and maintain than traditional energy produced by fossil fuels and has only recently become as cost efficient as fossil fuels. Since the discovery of greener energy sources only richer developed nations have been able to invest and integrate renewable energy into their power production industries.

In countries such as Russia, it has been found that in areas where income was higher that there was an increase in uncontrolled air pollution. However while income may have been higher in these regions a greater disparity in income inequality was found. It was discovered that "greater income inequality within a region is associated with more pollution, implying that it is not only the level of income that matters but also its distribution". In Russia areas lacking in hospital beds suffer from greater air pollution than areas with higher numbers of beds per capita which implies that the poor or inadequate distribution of public services also may add to the environmental inequality of that region.

Another consequence of income inequality's association with environmental inequality is the environmental privilege of consumers in developed countries, "consumers of goods and services that are produced by polluting industries [who] often are spatially and socially separated from the people who bear the impacts of the pollution". Those who are working in the production of consumer goods suffer a disproportionate amount of the consequences of environmental deterioration.

Exposure health impacts 
Environmental justice communities are disproportionately exposed to higher chemical pollution, reduced air quality, contaminated water sources, and overall reduced health. A lack of acknowledgement and policy changes surrounding the exposures that impact the overall health of these communities leads to a decrease in both environmental and human health. Environmental justice communities can be identified by various methods such as:

 threshold – geographic areas
 community based identification
 population weighting

While there are multiple ways to identify environmental justice communities, common environmental exposures in these environmental justice communities include air pollution and water pollution hazards. Due to a majority of environmental justice communities being of a lower socioeconomic status, many of the members of the communities work in crowded jobs with hazardous exposures such as warehouses and mines. The main routes of exposure are through inhalation, absorption, and ingestion. When workers leave the work environment it is likely they take the chemicals with them on their clothing, shoes, skin, and hair. The traveling of these chemicals can then reach their homes and further impact their families, including children. The children of these communities have been described as a uniquely exposed population due to the way they metabolize and absorb contaminants differently than adults. Compared to children in other communities, children in environmental justice communities may be exposed to a higher level of contaminants throughout the life course, beginning from utero (through the placenta), infancy (through breast milk), early childhood and beyond. Due to the increased exposure they are at a greater risk for adverse health effects like respiratory conditions, gastrointestinal conditions, and mental conditions.

The placement of fracking sites and concentrated animal feeding operations (CAFOs) in some of these areas are also large contributors to the adverse health effects experienced by members of these communities. The CAFOs also release harmful gas emissions into the air (ammonia, volatile organic compounds, endotoxins, etc.) greatly reducing the surrounding air quality. They can also pollute the soil and nearby water sources. Fracking sites can release toxic emissions, particularly methane, that also pollutes the air and contaminates the water.

On a global scale, the recent boom in fast fashion has also been a major exposure to environmental hazards in environmental justice communities due to the quick manufacturing and dumping of large quantities of products. 95% of clothing production takes place in low- or middle-income countries where the workers are under-resourced. The occupational hazards such as poor ventilation can lead to respiratory hazards including synthetic air particles and cotton dust. The textile dyeing can also result in an exposure hazard if the water used to for the dyeing is not treated prior to entering the local water systems leading to the release of toxicants and heavy metals in the water used by residents and for livestock.

Around the world

Environmental justice campaigns have arisen from local conflicts all over the world. The Environmental Justice Atlas documented 3,100 environmental conflicts worldwide as of April 2020 and emphasised that many more conflicts remained undocumented.

Africa

Democratic Republic of the Congo 

Mining for cobalt and copper in the Democratic Republic of the Congo (DRC) has resulted in environmental injustice and numerous environmental conflicts including 

 Mutanda mine
 Kamoto mine
 Tilwezembe mine

Conflict minerals mined in the DRC perpetuate armed conflict.

Ethiopia 
Mining for gold and other minerals has resulted in environmental injustice and environmental conflict in Ethiopia including 

 Lega Dembi mine: thousands of people were exposed to mercury by MIDROC coporation, resulting in poisoned food, death of livestock and many miscairrages and birth defects.
 Kenticha mine

Kenya 
Kenya has, since independence in 1963, focused on environmental protectionism. Environmental activists such as Wangari Maathai stood for and defend natural and environmental resources, often coming into conflict with the Daniel Arap Moi and his government. The country has suffered Environmental issues arising from rapid urbanization especially in Nairobi, where the public space, Uhuru Park, and game parks such as the Nairobi National Park have suffered encroachment to pave way for infrastructural developments like the Standard Gage Railway and the Nairobi Expressway. one of the Top environmental lawyers, Kariuki Muigua, has championed environmental Justice and access to information and legal protection, authoring the Environmental Justice Thesis on Kenya's milestones.

Nigeria 

From 1956 to 2006, up to 1.5 million tons of oil were spilled in the Niger Delta, (50 times the volume spilled in the Exxon Valdez disaster). Indigenous people in the region have suffered the loss of their livelihoods as a result of these environmental issues, and they have received no benefits in return for enormous oil revenues extracted from their lands. Environmental conflicts have exacerbated ongoing conflict in the Niger Delta.

Ogoni people, who are indigenous to Nigeria's oil-rich Delta region have protested the disastrous environmental and economic effects of Shell Oil's drilling and denounced human rights abuses by the Nigerian government and by Shell. Their international appeal intensified dramatically after the execution in 1995 of nine Ogoni activists, including Ken Saro-Wiwa, who was a founder of the nonviolent Movement for the Survival of the Ogoni People (MOSOP).

South Africa 
Under colonial and apartheid governments in South Africa, thousands of black South Africans were removed from their ancestral lands to make way for game parks. Earthlife Africa was formed in 1988, making it Africa's first environmental justice organisation. In 1992, the Environmental Justice Networking Forum (EJNF), a nationwide umbrella organization designed to coordinate the activities of environmental activists and organizations interested in social and environmental justice, was created. By 1995, the network expanded to include 150 member organizations and by 2000, it included over 600 member organizations.

With the election of the African National Congress (ANC) in 1994, the environmental justice movement gained an ally in government. The ANC noted "poverty and environmental degradation have been closely linked" in South Africa. The ANC made it clear that environmental inequalities and injustices would be addressed as part of the party's post-apartheid reconstruction and development mandate. The new South African Constitution, finalized in 1996, includes a Bill of Rights that grants South Africans the right to an "environment that is not harmful to their health or well-being" and "to have the environment protected, for the benefit of present and future generations through reasonable legislative and other measures that
prevent pollution and ecological degradation;
promote conservation; and
secure ecologically sustainable development and use of natural resources while promoting justifiable economic and social development".

South Africa's mining industry is the largest single producer of solid waste, accounting for about two-thirds of the total waste stream. Tens of thousands of deaths have occurred among mine workers as a result of accidents over the last century. There have been several deaths and debilitating diseases from work-related illnesses like asbestosis. For those who live next to a mine, the quality of air and water is poor. Noise, dust, and dangerous equipment and vehicles can be threats to the safety of those who live next to a mine as well. These communities are often poor and black and have little choice over the placement of a mine near their homes. The National Party introduced a new Minerals Act that began to address environmental considerations by recognizing the health and safety concerns of workers and the need for land rehabilitation during and after mining operations. In 1993, the Act was amended to require each new mine to have an Environmental Management Program Report (EMPR) prepared before breaking ground. These EMPRs were intended to force mining companies to outline all the possible environmental impacts of the particular mining operation and to make provision for environmental management.

In October 1998, the Department of Minerals and Energy released a White Paper entitled A Minerals and Mining Policy for South Africa, which included a section on Environmental Management. The White Paper states "Government, in recognition of the responsibility of the State as custodian of the nation's natural resources, will ensure that the essential development of the country's mineral resources will take place within a framework of sustainable development and in accordance with national environmental policy, norms, and standards". It adds that any environmental policy "must ensure a cost-effective and competitive mining industry."

Asia
Noah Diffenbaugh and Marshall Burke in their study of inequality in Asia demonstrated the interactionalism of economic inequality and global warming. For instance, globalization and industrialization increased the chances of global warming. However, industrialization also allowed wealth inequality to perpetuate. For example, New Delhi is the epicenter of the industrial revolution in the Indian continent, but there is significant wealth disparity. Furthermore, because of global warming, countries like Sweden and Norway can capitalize on warmer temperatures, while most of the world's poorest countries are significantly poorer than they would have been if global warming had not occurred.

China 
In China, factories create harmful waste such as nitrogen oxide and sulfur dioxide which cause health risks. Journalist and science writer Fred Pearce notes that in China "most monitoring of urban air still concentrates on one or at most two pollutants, sometimes particulates, sometimes nitrogen oxides or sulfur dioxides or ozone. Similarly, most medical studies of the impacts of these toxins look for links between single pollutants and suspected health effects such as respiratory disease and cardiovascular conditions."  The country emits about a third of all the human-made sulfur dioxide (SO2), nitrogen oxides (NOx), and particulates pollution in the world. The Global Burden of Disease Study, an international collaboration, estimates that 1.1 million Chinese die from the effects of this air pollution each year, roughly a third of the global death toll." The economic cost of deaths due to air pollution is estimated at 267 billion yuan (US$38 billion) per year.

Indonesia 
Environmental conflicts in Indonesia include:

 The Arun gas field where ExxonMobil's development of a natural gas export industry contributed to the insurgency in Aceh in which secessionist fighters led by the Free Aceh Movement attempted to gain independence from the central government which had taken billions in gas revenues from the region without much benefit to the Aceh province. Violence directed toward the gas industry led Exxon to contract with the Indonesian military for protection of the Arun field and subsequent human rights abuses in Aceh.

South Korea 

Environmental justice movements in South Korea have arisen from conflicts including:

 Saemangeum Seawall
 Seoul-Incheon canal

Australia

Discriminatory siting of nuclear and hazardous waste facilities has generated environmental justice movements in Australia.

Europe
For further information, see Environmental racism in Europe

In Europe, the Romani peoples are ethnic minorities and differ from the rest of the European people by their culture, language, and history. The environmental discrimination that they experience ranges from the unequal distribution of environmental harms as well as the unequal distribution of education, health services and employment. In many countries Romani peoples are forced to live in the slums because many of the laws to get residence permits are discriminatory against them. This forces Romani people to live in urban "ghetto" type housing or in shantytowns. In the Czech Republic and Romania, the Romani peoples are forced to live in places that have less access to running water and sewage, and in Ostrava, Czech Republic, the Romani people live in apartments located above an abandoned mine, which emits methane. Also in Bulgaria, the public infrastructure extends throughout the town of Sofia until it reaches the Romani village where there is very little water access or sewage capacity.

The European Union is trying to strive towards environmental justice by putting into effect declarations that state that all people have a right to a healthy environment. The Stockholm Declaration, the 1987 Brundtland Commission's Report – "Our Common Future", the Rio Declaration, and Article 37 of the Charter of Fundamental Rights of the European Union, all are ways that the Europeans have put acts in place to work toward environmental justice. Europe also funds action-oriented projects that work on furthering Environmental Justice throughout the world. For example, EJOLT (Environmental Justice Organisations, Liabilities and Trade) is a large multinational project supported through the FP7 Science in Society budget line from the European Commission. From March 2011 to March 2015, 23 civil society organizations and universities from 20 countries in Europe, Africa, Latin-America, and Asia are, and have promised to work together on advancing the cause of Environmental Justice. EJOLT is building up case studies, linking organisations worldwide, and making an interactive global map of Environmental Justice. A recent study of Environmental justice in Natura 2000 notes that an environmental just policy can empower residents with the capacity to initiate social change. In return, this social change modifies the form that empowerment will take.

Similar to other countries around the world, the European Environment Agency (EEA) identifies that environmental inequality issues remain at the core of environment, society, and economy. Social circumstances often seem to correlate with the exposure, vulnerability, and sensitivity to environmental hazards. In Europe, "the quality of the environment varies significantly across Europe; in general terms between east and west, but also between countries, regions and neighbourhoods within cities" (Ganzleben and Kazmierczak, par.10). The EEA ran a report that was able to identify the inequality between exposure to environmental hazards such as pollution, noise, and high temperatures, and socioeconomic status. The results of the report established that poverty-stricken European residential areas are more inclined to be exposed to these environmental health hazards which tend to contribute to more environmental stressors. However, the nature of this evidence varies due to geographical circumstances. For example, Western Europe has more extensive examples of environmental health hazards due to their governments' in-comprehensive knowledge of these various health hazards and how they affect their residential areas.

Sweden

Sweden became the first country to ban DDT in 1969. In the 1980s, women activists organized around preparing jam made from pesticide-tainted berries, which they offered to the members of parliament. Parliament members refused, and this has often been cited as an example of direct action within ecofeminism.

United Kingdom

Whilst the predominant agenda of the Environmental Justice movement in the United States has been tackling issues of race, inequality, and the environment, environmental justice campaigns around the world have developed and shifted in focus. For example, the EJ movement in the United Kingdom is quite different. It focuses on issues of poverty and the environment, but also tackles issues of health inequalities and social exclusion. A UK-based NGO, named the Environmental Justice Foundation, has sought to make a direct link between the need for environmental security and the defense of basic human rights. They have launched several high-profile campaigns that link environmental problems and social injustices. A campaign against illegal, unreported and unregulated (IUU) fishing highlighted how 'pirate' fisherman are stealing food from local, artisanal fishing communities. They have also launched a campaign exposing the environmental and human rights abuses involved in cotton production in Uzbekistan. Cotton produced in Uzbekistan is often harvested by children for little or no pay. In addition, the mismanagement of water resources for crop irrigation has led to the near eradication of the Aral Sea. The Environmental Justice Foundation has successfully petitioned large retailers such as Wal-mart and Tesco to stop selling Uzbek cotton.

Building of alternatives to climate change

In France, numerous Alternatiba events, or villages of alternatives, are providing hundreds of alternatives to climate change and lack of environmental justice, both in order to raise people's awareness and to stimulate behaviour change. They have been or will be organized in over sixty different French and European cities, such as Bilbao, Brussels, Geneva, Lyon or Paris.

North and Central America

Canada 
Environmental justice movements arising from local conflicts in Canada include

 Coastal GasLink pipeline
 2020 Candainan pipeline and railway protests
 Fairy Creek timber blockade
 Grassy Narrows road blockade
 Grassy Narrows mercury poisoning
 Trans Mountain pipeline

Guatemala 
Environmental justice movements arising from local conflicts in Guatemala include

 Escobal mine

Mexico 
Environmental justice movements arising from local conflicts in Mexico include

 Dolores mine

United States 

Definitions of environmental inequality typically emphasize either 'disparate exposure' (unequal exposure to environmental harm) or 'discriminatory intent' (often based on race). Disparate exposure has health and social impacts. Poverty and race are associated with environmental injustice. Poor people account for more than 20% of the human health impacts from industrial toxic air releases, compared to 12.9% of the population nationwide. Some studies that test statistically for effects of race and ethnicity, while controlling for income and other factors, suggest racial gaps in exposure that persist across all bands of income.

States may also see placing toxic facilities near poor neighborhoods as preferential from a Cost Benefit Analysis (CBA) perspective. A CBA may favor placing a toxic facility near a city of 20,000 poor people than near a city of 5,000 wealthy people.  Terry Bossert of Range Resources reportedly has said that it deliberately locates its operations in poor neighbourhoods instead of wealthy areas where residents have more money to challenge its practices. Northern California's East Bay Refinery Corridor is an example of the disparities associated with race and income and proximity to toxic facilities.

Women 
The impacts of climate change have disproportionate effects on women and girls. Women tend to experience higher risks and greater burdens of climate change, because climate change is not gender neutral. Extreme weather events are tied to early marriage, sex trafficking, domestic violence, displacement, income loss, food insecurity, water scarcity, and health complications. In 2020, the Eta and Iota Hurricanes caused damage to Central American states. Many were displaced but it was women who were hit hardest. Similarly, in India, droughts have left women the most vulnerable compared to men.

It has been argued that environmental justice issues generally tend to affect women in communities more so than they affect men. Women also tend to be the leaders in environmental justice activist movements. As such, it is growing to be a mainstream feminist issue. Under feminist approaches to environmental justice, environmental issues and climate change are viewed through a lens that asserts that the patriarchy, white supremacy, racism, and capitalism are contributors to the impact that climate change has on women. This type of analysis to environmental justice advocates strategies that address the root causes of inequality, transform power relations, and support women's rights.

African-Americans 
African-Americans are affected by a variety of Environmental Justice issues. One notorious example is the "Cancer Alley" region of Louisiana. This 85-mile stretch of the Mississippi River between Baton Rouge and New Orleans is home to 125 companies that produce one quarter of the petrochemical products manufactured in the United States. The United States Commission on Civil Rights has concluded that the African-American community has been disproportionately affected by Cancer Alley as a result of Louisiana's current state and local permit system for hazardous facilities, as well as their low socio-economic status and limited political influence. Another incidence of long-term environmental injustice occurred in the "West Grove" community of Miami, Florida. From 1925 to 1970, the predominately poor, African American residents of the "West Grove" endured the negative effects of exposure to carcinogenic emissions and toxic waste discharge from a large trash incinerator called Old Smokey. Despite official acknowledgement as a public nuisance, the incinerator project was expanded in 1961. It was not until the surrounding, predominantly white neighborhoods began to experience the negative impacts from Old Smokey that the legal battle began to close the incinerator.

Indigenous Groups 
Indigenous groups are often the victims of environmental injustices. Native Americans have suffered abuses related to uranium mining in the American West. Churchrock, New Mexico, in Navajo territory was home to the longest continuous uranium mining in any Navajo land. From 1954 until 1968, the tribe leased land to mining companies who did not obtain consent from Navajo families or report any consequences of their activities. Not only did the miners significantly deplete the limited water supply, but they also contaminated what was left of the Navajo water supply with uranium. Kerr-McGee and United Nuclear Corporation, the two largest mining companies, argued that the Federal Water Pollution Control Act did not apply to them, and maintained that Native American land is not subject to environmental protections. The courts did not force them to comply with US clean water regulations until 1980.

Latinos 
The most common example of environmental injustice among Latinos is the exposure to pesticides faced by farmworkers. After DDT and other chlorinated hydrocarbon pesticides were banned in the United States in 1972, farmers began using more acutely toxic organophosphate pesticides such as parathion. A large portion of farmworkers in the US are working as undocumented immigrants, and as a result of their political disadvantage, are not able to protest against regular exposure to pesticides or benefit from the protections of Federal laws. Exposure to chemical pesticides in the cotton industry also affects farmers in India and Uzbekistan. Banned throughout much of the rest of the world because of the potential threat to human health and the natural environment, Endosulfan is a highly toxic chemical, the safe use of which cannot be guaranteed in the many developing countries it is used in. Endosulfan, like DDT, is an organochlorine and persists in the environment long after it has killed the target pests, leaving a deadly legacy for people and wildlife.

Residents of cities along the US-Mexico border are also affected. Maquiladoras are assembly plants operated by American, Japanese, and other foreign countries, located along the US-Mexico border. The maquiladoras use cheap Mexican labor to assemble imported components and raw material, and then transport finished products back to the United States. Much of the waste ends up being illegally dumped in sewers, ditches, or in the desert. Along the Lower Rio Grande Valley, maquiladoras dump their toxic wastes into the river from which 95 percent of residents obtain their drinking water. In the border cities of Brownsville, Texas, and Matamoros, Mexico, the rate of anencephaly (babies born without brains) is four times the national average.

South America

Ecuador 
Notable environmental justice movements in Ecuador have arisen from several local conflicts:

 Chevron Texaco's oil operations in the Lago Agro oil field resulted in spillage of seventeen million gallons of crude oil into local water supplies between 1967 and 1989. They also dumped over 19 billion gallons of toxic wastewater into unlined open pits and regional rivers. Represented by US lawyer Steven Donziger, Indigenous people fought Chevron in US and Ecuadorian courts for decades in attempts to recover damages.

Peru 
Notable environmental conflicts in Peru include

 Las Bambas copper mine
 Yanacocha gold mine

Transnational movement networks 
Many of the Environmental Justice Networks that began in the United States expanded their horizons to include many other countries and became Transnational Networks for Environmental Justice. These networks work to bring Environmental Justice to all parts of the world and protect all citizens of the world to reduce the environmental injustice happening all over the world. Listed below are some of the major Transnational Social Movement Organizations.

Basel Action Network – works to end toxic waste dumping in poor undeveloped countries from the rich developed countries.
GAIA (Global Anti-Incinerator Alliance) – works to find different ways to dispose of waste other than incineration. This company has people working in over 77 countries throughout the world.
GR (Global Response) – works to educate activists and the upper working class how to protect human rights and the ecosystem.
Greenpeace International – which was the first organization to become the global name of Environmental Justice. Greenpeace works to raise the global consciousness of transnational trade of toxic waste.
Health Care without Harm – works to improve public health by reducing the environmental impacts of the health care industry.
International Campaign for Responsible Technology – works to promote corporate and government accountability with electronics and how the disposal of technology affect the environment.
International POPs Elimination Network – works to reduce and eventually end the use of persistent organic pollutants (POPs) which are harmful to the environment.
PAN (Pesticide Action Network) – works to replace the use of hazardous pesticides with alternatives that are safe for the environment.

Outer space 
Over recent years social scientists have begun to view outer space in an environmental conceptual framework. Klinger, an environmental geographer, analyses the environmental features of outer space from the perspective of several schools of geopolitical. From a classical geopolitical approach, for instance, people's exploration of the outer space domain is, in fact, a manifestation of competing and conflicting interests between states, i.e., outer space is an asset used to strengthen and consolidate geopolitical power and has strategic value. From the perspective of environmental geopolitics, the issue of sustainable development has become a consensus politics. Countries thus cede power to international agreements and supranational organizations to manage global environmental issues. Such co-produced practices are followed in the human use of outer space, which means that only powerful nations are capable of reacting to protect the interests of underprivileged countries, so far from there being perfect environmental justice in environmental geopolitics.

Human interaction with outer space is environmentally based since a measurable environmental footprint will be left when modifying the Earth's environment (e.g., local environmental changes from launch sites) to access outer space, developing space-based technologies to study the Earth's environment, exploring space with spacecraft in orbit or by landing on the Moon, etc. Different stakeholders have competing territorial agendas for this vast space; thus, the ownership of these footprints is governed by geopolitical power and relations, which means that human involvement with outer space falls into the field of environmental justice.

Activities on Earth 
On Earth, the environmental geopolitics of outer space is directly linked to issues of environmental justice - the launch of spacecraft and the impact of their launch processes on the surrounding environment, and the impact of space-based related technologies and facilities on the development process of human society. As both processes require the support of industry, infrastructure, and networks of information and take place in specific locations, this leads to continuous interaction with local territorial governance.

Launches and infrastructures 
Rockets are generally launched in areas where conventional and potentially catastrophic blast damage can be controlled, generally in an open and unoccupied territory. Despite the absence of human life and habitation, other forms of life exist in these open territories, maintaining the local ecological balance and material cycles. Toxic particulate matter from rocket launches can cause localized acid rain, plant and animal mortality, reduced food production, and other hazards.

Moreover, space activities result in environmental injustice on a global scale. Spacecraft are the only contributors to direct human-derived pollution in the stratosphere, which comes mostly from the launch activities of rich economies in the northern hemisphere, while the global north bears more of the environmental consequences.

Environmental injustice is further evidenced by the limited research into the effects on downstream human and non-human communities and the inadequate tracking of pollutants in ecological chains and environments.

Space-based technologies 
While space-based technologies have been applied to tracking natural disasters and the spread of pollutants, access to these technologies and the monitoring of data is deeply uneven within and between countries, exacerbating environmental injustice. Further, the use of technology by powerful countries can even lead to the creation of policies and institutions in less privileged nations, changing land-use regimes to favor or disadvantage the survival of certain human groups. For example, in the decades following the publication of the first report on the use of satellite imagery to measure rainforest deforestation in the 1980s, several environmental groups rose to prominence and also influenced changes in domestic policy in Brazil.

See also 

Alton, Rhode Island - a town struggling with a large, polluting dye company
Carbon fee and dividend
Climate resilience
Degrowth
Ecocide
Ecological civilization
Environmental contract
Environmental crime
Environmental dumping
Environmental history
Environmental Justice Foundation
Environmental justice and coal mining in Appalachia
Environmental Racism in the United States
Environmental sociology
Equality impact assessment
Extinction debt
Fenceline community
Global waste trade
Green New Deal
Greening
Health equity
Human impact on the environment
Hunters Point, San Francisco, California - a neighborhood next to a Superfund site
List of environmental lawsuits
Pollution is Colonialism
Netherlands fallacy
Resource justice
Rights of nature
Rural Action - an organization promoting social and environmental justice in Appalachian Ohio
Sustainable development
Toxic 100
Toxic colonialism
Solarpunk

References

Further reading
 
 Foster, John Bellamy, Brett Clark, and Richard York, The Ecological Rift: Capitalism's War on the Earth, Monthly Review Press, 2011. Considers ecosystem collapse and its effects on populations.
 Shiva, Vandana, Soil Not Oil: Environmental Justice in an Age of Climate Crisis, South End Press, 2008. An environmental justice text addressing climate change and agriculture.
 White, Robert, Controversies in Environmental Sociology, Cambridge University Press, 2004. Overview of topics in environmental sociology with many justice related issues.
 Zehner, Ozzie, Green Illusions, University of Nebraska Press, 2012. An environmental justice book forming a critique of energy production and green consumerism.
 Interview with Dr. Heather Eaton on the issue of Christianity and Ecological Literacy, Green Majority radio program, 13 July 2007.
 Interview with Dr. Christopher Lind on the issue of "Ecojustice" and Biblical Hermeneutics, Green Majority radio program, 21 December 2007.
 
 Environmental justice and Indigenous environmental justice.

External links

 
Environmental Justice & Environmental Racism
EJOLT is a mixed civil society and research long-term project linking environmental justice organizations from 20 countries
Alternatives for Community and Environment- is an Environmental Justice group based in Roxbury, Massachusetts
 http://www.cbecal.org - Communities for a Better Environment
Greenaction
Weekly Environmental Justice Reports from Inner City Press
International Conference on Environmental Justice and Enforcement.
Sustainable South Bronx- is an internationally recognized leader on poverty alleviation, public health concerns and climate crisis solutions

Environmental Justice articles from New Internationalist magazine
Federal Pollution Control Laws: How Are They Enforced? Congressional Research Service
Environmental Justice, Environmental Protection Agency
The Intergovernmental Panel on Climate Change

 
Justice
Justice